Russell Gómez Martín is a former Grand Prix motorcycle racer from Spain. He has previously competed in the Spanish Supersport Championship (where he was runner-up in 2007) and the Spanish Moto2 Championship.

Career statistics

By season

Races by year
(key)

References

External links
 Profile on motogp.com

1987 births
Living people
Spanish motorcycle racers
Motorcycle racers from Catalonia
250cc World Championship riders